Santiram Mahato is an Indian politician and the present Minister for Self Help Group & Self-employment and P.U.P department of Government of West Bengal. He is also an MLA, elected from the Balarampur constituency in the 2011 West Bengal state assembly election.
Also prominent social worker and Presently WB State President to Hindustan Scouts and Guides Association, Manhamana Malviya Mission ITO New Delhi.

References 

State cabinet ministers of West Bengal
Living people
1953 births
West Bengal MLAs 2016–2021
West Bengal MLAs 2011–2016